Nestor Alexandrovich Kotlyarevsky (Не′стор Алекса′ндрович Котляре′вский February 2, 1863, Moscow, Russian Empire, - May 12, 1925, Leningrad, USSR) was a Russian author, publicist, literary critic and historian. A high-profile scholar and a Russian academy honorary member (since 1906), Kotlyarevsky taught the history of literature at Moscow University, a series of his lectures served later as a foundation for one of his best known works, The Nineteenth Century (1921). Kotlyarevsky also went down in history as the first director of the Pushkin House (1910).

References 

1863 births
Writers from Moscow
Russian literary critics
Russian journalists
1925 deaths
Academic staff of Moscow State University
Russian educators
Burials at Nikolskoe Cemetery